Harold Chadwick Meadowcroft (1889 – 1 July 1916) was an English professional footballer who played in the Football League for Glossop and Bury. He played as a right half or outside right.

Personal life 
Meadowcroft was one of 14 children and grew up in Bury. He worked as a commercial traveller. In 1914, during the early months of the First World War he enlisted in the Manchester Regiment. Serving as a corporal in the Manchester Pals, Meadowcroft was shot by a sniper while leading his section on the first day of the Somme. He was buried in Dantzig Alley British Cemetery, Mametz.

References

1889 births
1916 deaths
Sportspeople from Workington
Association football wing halves
Association football outside forwards
English footballers
Rochdale A.F.C. players
Glossop North End A.F.C. players
Bury F.C. players
English Football League players
British Army personnel of World War I
Manchester Regiment soldiers
Military personnel from Cumberland
British military personnel killed in the Battle of the Somme
Burials at Dantzig Alley British Cemetery
Deaths by firearm in France
Footballers from Cumbria

Macclesfield F.C. players